Togiak River (Yup'ik: Tuyuryaq) is a stream,  long, in the southwestern part of the U.S. state of Alaska.

Large catches of salmon are landed during the summer at the commercial cannery in Togiak, and the fishery is also very important for subsistence harvesting by the local Alaska Natives.

The Togiak is a popular and productive river for sport fishing, producing very good catches of all five species of Pacific salmon. Dolly Varden char and rainbow trout are also present, and sport fishing is a substantial contributor to the local economy.

The river itself is very scenic, especially in the upper wilderness area, flanked by hills and distant mountains. Float trips are becoming increasingly popular, with excellent chances of observing wildlife including brown bears, caribou, moose, eagles and beaver.

See also
List of rivers of Alaska
Togiak Wilderness

References

Rivers of Dillingham Census Area, Alaska
Rivers of Alaska
Rivers of Unorganized Borough, Alaska